Navesink Beach is an unincorporated community located within Sea Bright in Monmouth County, New Jersey, United States. It is one of the four main built-up areas of Sea Bright and is the northernmost settled area of the borough. Navesink Beach is a former stop on the New Jersey Southern Railroad. The Sea Bright–Monmouth Beach Seawall passes through the neighborhood and Normandie.

References

Sea Bright, New Jersey
Unincorporated communities in Monmouth County, New Jersey
Unincorporated communities in New Jersey